Moonrise is the seventh studio album by Dutch singer Loona.

Track listing
"Angel" – 3:49
"Salam Aleikoum" – 2:56
"Shining Star (Gipsy Circus)" – 3:35
"Por La Noche" – 2:58
"Et Me Voila" – 3:18
"Eternally" – 4:18
"In The Sound Of Silence" – 4:24
"No One Loves You (Like I Do)" – 4:40
"Love (One on one)" – 3:53
"Hot Stuff" – 3:20 (cover of Donna Summer song)
"Na Na Na" – 3:21
"Sube El Calor - 3:23  
"Isla Del Sol" - 3:22
"Va Saliendo La Luna" - 3:51
"Gib Mir Deine Angst" - 4:15 (cover of Udo Jürgens song)
"Hijo De La Luna 2008" - 5:43
"Prince Of Love 2008" - 3:56
"Bailando 2008" - 3:26
"Mamboleo 2008" - 3:40
"Rhythm Of The Night 2008" - 3:45
"Por La Noche" - 3:33 <small> (Canis Club Mix)

Loona (singer) albums
2008 albums
Spanish-language albums
Ariola Records albums
Sony BMG albums